is an aerial lift line in the Kiso Mountains range, Nagano Prefecture, Japan.

Description
The line, opened in 1967, climbs up to Senjōjiki Cirque 2600m above sea level, and it is easiest route to Mount Kisokoma and Mount Hōken. Summit station, Senjōjiki, is known as the station with the highest altitude in the country, .  The Kiso Mountains are the "Central Alps" of the scenic Japanese Alps group, located on central Honshu.

The Chūō Arupusu Kankō company operates Central Alps sightseeing line. The company is a member of Meitetsu Group (Nagoya Railroad), and also operates hotels and ski resorts.

Specifications
System: Aerial tramway, 1 track cable and 2 haulage ropes
Distance: 
Vertical interval: 
The largest in Japan. 
Passenger capacity per a cabin: 61
Stations: 2
Summit:Senjōjiki station (also equipped Hotel Senjōjiki)
Bottom: Shirabidaira station 
Time required for single ride: 7 minutes, 30 seconds.

See also
Kiso Mountains topics
List of aerial lifts in Japan

External links
 Official Komagatake Ropeway website

 
Aerial tramways in Japan
Kiso Mountains
Meitetsu Group
Transport in Nagano Prefecture
Tourist attractions in Nagano Prefecture
1967 establishments in Japan